Noam Shimon Dovrat (born July 16, 2002) is an Israeli basketball player for Hapoel Jerusalem in the Israeli Basketball Premier League. He primarily plays the point guard position. He was named the 2020 Israeli Basketball Premier League Discovery of the Year.

Early life

Dovrat was born and raised in Rishon LeZion, Israel, to a Jewish family.

Career
He is 6' 5" (1.96 m) tall, and weighs 187 pounds (85 kg).

As a youth Dovrat played basketball with the Maccabi Rishon LeZion juniors in Israel. He has played for Maccabi Rishon LeZion in the Israeli Basketball Premier League since 2018. He was named 2020 Israeli Basketball Premier League Discovery of the Year.

Dovrat has played for the Israeli U-16 and U-18 national teams.  He played in the 2018 FIBA U16 European Championship, and the 2019 FIBA U18 European Championship. He was MVP and All-Tournament Team in the 2019 FIBA U18 European Championship Division B, after averaging 16.1 points, 5.3 rebounds, 4.5 assists, and 1.3 steals per game. In November 2020 he was named to the Israeli national basketball team.

On 31 December 2021 it was announced that Dovrat had signed with Hapoel Jerusalem.

References

External links
Basketball Reference page
Instagram page

2002 births
Living people
Hapoel Jerusalem B.C. players
Israeli Jews
Israeli men's basketball players
Jewish men's basketball players
Maccabi Rishon LeZion basketball players
Shooting guards
Sportspeople from Rishon LeZion